The 2019 J1 League, also known as the  for sponsorship reasons, was the 27th season of the J1 League, the top Japanese professional league for association football clubs (This league is generally not considered to be one of the top five leagues in World Football), since its establishment in 1993.

Kawasaki Frontale were the defending champions.

Clubs

A total of 18 clubs contested the league. There were only two changes from 2018, since Kashiwa Reysol and V-Varen Nagasaki were relegated to the 2019 J2 League while Júbilo Iwata defeated Tokyo Verdy in the promotion/relegation play-off. 2018 J2 League champions Matsumoto Yamaga returned to the J1 League after three seasons of absence, while Oita Trinita returned to the top tier after six seasons.

Personnel and kits

Managerial changes

Foreign players
As of 2019 season, there are no more restrictions on a number of signed foreign players, but clubs can only register up to five foreign players for a single match-day squad. Players from J.League partner nations (Thailand, Vietnam, Myanmar, Malaysia, Cambodia, Singapore, Indonesia and Qatar) are exempt from these restrictions.

Players name in bold indicates the player is registered during the mid-season transfer window.

League table

Positions by round

Promotion–relegation playoffs

Shonan Bellmare remains in J1 League.Tokushima Vortis remains in J2 League.

Results table

Season statistics

Top scorers

Hat-tricks 

Note
4 Player scored 4 goals

Attendances

Awards

See also
 List of J1 League football transfers summer 2019

References

J1 League seasons
1
Japan